The 2002 Philippine Basketball Association (PBA) Samsung–PBA Commissioner's Cup was the second conference of the 2002 PBA season. It started on June 16 and ended on September 20, 2002. The tournament requires two imports per each team.

Format
The following format will be observed for the duration of the conference:
 One-round robin eliminations; 10 games per team; Teams are then seeded by basis on win–loss records.
 The top eight teams after the eliminations will advance to the quarterfinals.
Quarterfinals:
Top four teams will have a twice-to-beat advantage against their opponent.
QF1: #1 vs. #8
QF2: #2 vs. #7
QF3: #3 vs. #6
QF4: #4 vs. #5
Best-of-five semifinals:
SF1: QF1 vs. QF4
SF2: QF2 vs. QF3
Third-place playoff: losers of the semifinals
Best-of-seven finals: winners of the semifinals

List of Imports
Each team were allowed two imports. The first line in the table are the original reinforcements of the teams. Below the name are the replacement of the import above. Same with the third replacement that is also highlighted with a different color. GP is the number of games played.

Elimination round

Team standings

Bracket

Quarterfinals 
In each match-up, the lower-seeded team has to win twice, while the higher-seeded team only once, to progress.

(1) Red Bull vs. (8) Shell

(2) Sta. Lucia vs. (7) Talk 'N Text

(3) Alaska vs. (6) FedEx

(4) San Miguel vs. (5) Coca-Cola

Semifinals

(1) Red Bull vs. (4) San Miguel

(3) Alaska vs. (7) Talk 'N Text

Third place playoff

Finals

References

External links
 PBA.ph

Commissioner's Cup
PBA Commissioner's Cup